Joseph F. Norvell (born April 14, 1950) is an American former politician who served in the Kansas House of Representatives and Kansas State Senate.

Norvell was first elected to the Kansas House in 1972, serving two terms there. In 1976, he was elected to the Kansas Senate, where he served for three terms before being succeeded by Jerry Moran.

References

1950 births
Living people
Democratic Party Kansas state senators
Democratic Party members of the Kansas House of Representatives
20th-century American politicians
People from Hays, Kansas